Frank Elmer Gleich [Inch] (March 7, 1894 – March 27, 1949) was a backup outfielder in Major League Baseball who played from  through  for the New York Yankees. He was born in Columbus, Ohio.
 
In a two-season career, Gleich was a .133 hitter (6-for-45) with six runs and four RBI in 29 games. He did not have any extra-base hits. He made 19 outfield appearances at left field (12), center (5) and right (2), committing four errors in 23 chances for a collective .826 fielding percentage.

Gleich later played in the Pacific Coast League. Following his baseball career, he worked as a police lieutenant for the Pennsylvania Railroad. He also served  in the military during World War I. Gleich died in his homeland of Columbus, Ohio at age 55.

References

Baseball Library
The Deadball Era

New York Yankees players
Major League Baseball outfielders
American military personnel of World War I
Baseball players from Columbus, Ohio
1894 births
1949 deaths